The Royal Aeronautical Society, also known as the RAeS, is a British multi-disciplinary professional institution dedicated to the global aerospace community. Founded in 1866, it is the oldest aeronautical society in the world. Members, Fellows, and Companions of the society can use the post-nominal letters MRAeS, FRAeS, or CRAeS, respectively.

Function
The objectives of The Royal Aeronautical Society include: to support and maintain high professional standards in aerospace disciplines; to provide a unique source of specialist information and a local forum for the exchange of ideas; and to exert influence in the interests of aerospace in the public and industrial arenas, including universities. 

The Royal Aeronautical Society is a worldwide society with an international network of 67 branches. Many practitioners of aerospace disciplines use the Society's designatory post-nominals such as FRAeS, CRAeS, MRAeS, AMRAeS, and ARAeS (incorporating the former graduate grade, GradRAeS).

The RAeS headquarters is located in the United Kingdom. The staff of the Royal Aeronautical Society are based at the Society's headquarters at No. 4 Hamilton Place, London, W1J 7BQ.  The headquarters is on the north-east edge of Hyde Park Corner, with the nearest access being Hyde Park Corner tube station.  In addition to offices for its staff the building is used for Royal Aeronautical Society conferences and events  and parts of the building are available on a private hire basis for events.

Publications

 The Journal of the Royal Aeronautical Society:  (1923–1967)
 The Aeronautical Quarterly: (1949-1983) 
 Aerospace: (1969-1997) 
 Aerospace International:  (1997 - 2013)
 The Aerospace Professional: (1998 - 2013)
 The Aeronautical Journal:  (1897 to date)
 The Journal of Aeronautical History: (2011 to date)
 AEROSPACE:  (2013 to date)

Branches and divisions 
Branches are the regional embodiment of the Society. They deliver membership benefits and provide a global platform for the dissemination of aerospace information. As of September 2013, branches located in the United Kingdom include: Belfast, Birmingham, Boscombe Down, Bristol, Brough, Cambridge, Cardiff, Chester, Christchurch, Coventry, Cranfield, Cranwell, Derby, FAA Yeovilton, Farnborough, Gatwick, Gloucester & Cheltenham, Hatfield, Heathrow, Highland, Isle of Wight, Isle of Man, Loughborough, Manchester, Marham, Medway, Oxford, Preston, Prestwick, Sheffield, Solent, Southend, Stevenage, Swindon, Weybridge, and Yeovil.

The RAeS international branch network includes: Adelaide, Auckland, Blenheim, Brisbane, Brussels, Canberra, Canterbury, Cyprus, Dublin, Hamburg, Hamilton, Hong Kong, Malaysia, Melbourne, Montreal, Munich, Palmerston North, Paris, Perth, Seattle, Singapore, Sydney, Toulouse, and the UAE.

Divisions of the Society have been formed in countries and regions that can sustain a number of Branches. Divisions operate with a large degree of autonomy, being responsible for their own branch network, membership recruitment, subscription levels, conference and lecture programmes.

Specialist Groups covering all facets of the aerospace industry exist under the overall umbrella of the Society, with the aim of serving the interests of both enthusiasts and industry professionals.

The Groups' remit is to consider significant developments in their field, and they attempt to achieve this through their conferences and lectures, with the intention of stimulating debate and facilitating action on key industry issues in order to reflect and respond to the constant innovation and progress in aviation. The Groups also act as focal points for all enquiries to the Society concerning their specialist subject matter, forming a crucial interface between the Society and the world in general.

As of September 2013, the Specialist Group committees are as follows: Aerodynamics, Aerospace Medicine, Air Power, Air Law, Air Transport, Airworthiness & Maintenance, Avionics & Systems, Environment, Flight Operations, Flight Simulation, Flight Test, General Aviation, Greener by Design, Historical, Human Factors, Human Powered Flight, Propulsion, Rotorcraft, Space, Structures & Materials, UAS, Weapons Systems & Technologies, and  Women in Aviation & Aerospace.

In 2009, the Royal Aeronautical Society formed a group of experts to document how to better simulate aircraft upset conditions, and thus improve training programs.

History

The Society was founded in January 1866 with the name "The Aeronautical Society of Great Britain" and is the oldest aeronautical society in the world. Early or founding members included James Glaisher, Francis Wenham, the Duke of Argyll, and Frederick Brearey. In the first year, there were 65 members, at the end of the second year, 91 members, and in the third year, 106 members. Annual reports were produced in the first decades. In 1868 the Society held a major exhibition at London's Crystal Palace with 78 entries. John Stringfellow's steam engine was shown there. The Society sponsored the first wind tunnel in 1870-71, designed by Wenham and Browning.

In 1918, the organization's name was changed to the Royal Aeronautical Society.

In 1923 its principal journal was renamed from The Aeronautical Journal to The Journal of the Royal Aeronautical Society and in 1927 the Institution of Aeronautical Engineers Journal was merged into it.

In 1940, the RAeS responded to the wartime need to expand the aircraft industry. The Society established a Technical Department to bring together the best available knowledge and present it in an authoritative and accessible form – a working tool for engineers who might come from other industries and lack the specialised knowledge required for aircraft design. This technical department became known as the Engineering Sciences Data Unit (ESDU) and eventually became a separate entity in the 1980s.

In 1987 the 'Society of Licensed Aircraft Engineers and Technologists', previously called the 'Society of Licensed Aircraft Engineers' was incorporated into the Royal Aeronautical Society.

Presidents
The following have served as President of the Royal Aeronautical Society:

1886-95 George Campbell, 8th Duke of Argyll
1895-00 (None)
1900–07 B. Baden-Powell
1907-08 (None)
1908–11 E. P. Frost
1911–19 (None)
1919–26 William Weir, 1st Viscount Weir 
1926-27 Air Vice Marshal Sir William Sefton Brancker
1927-30 W Forbes-Sempill
1930–34 C. R. Fairey
1934–36 J. Moore-Brabazon
1936–38 H. E. Wimperis
1938–40 R. Fedden
1940–42 G. Brewer
1942–44 A. Gouge
1944-45 Sir Roy Fedden
1945–47 F. H. Page
1947–49 H. R. Cox
1949–50 J. Buchanan
1950-51 G. P. Bulman
1951–52 F. B. Halford
1952–53 G. Dowty
1953–54 Sir William Farren
1954–55 S. Camm
1955–56 N. E. Rowe
1956–57 E. T. Jones
1957–58 G. R. Edwards
1958–59 A. A. Hall
1959–60 P. G. Masefield
1960–61 E. S. Moult
1961–62 R. O. Jones
1962–63 B. S. Shenstone
1963–64 A. R. Collar
1964-65 H.H Gardner
1965-66 Sir George Gardner
1966-   Honorary President Prince Philip, Duke of Edinburgh
1966-67 A.D Baxter
1967-68 M.B Morgan
1968–69 David Keith-Lucas
1969–70 F. R. Banks
1970–71 Air Commodore J.R Morgan
1971-72 S.D Davies
1972-73 K.G Wilkinson 
1973-74 Dr G.S Hislop
1974-75 B.P Laight 
1975-76 Air Marshal Sir Charles Pringle
1976-77 C. Abell 
1977-78 Handel Davies
1978-79 Professor L.F Crabtree
1979-80 R.P Probert
1980-81 P.A Hearne 
1981-82 J.T Stamper 
1982-83 Captain E.M Brown
1983-84 Professor M.G Farley 
1984–85 Geoffrey Pardoe
1985–86 Thomas Kerr
1986–87 John Fozard
1987–88 John Stollery
1988–89 Dr P.H Calder
1989–90 Dr H. Metcalfe
1990–91 G.C Howell
1991–92 G.M McCoombe 
1992–93 Air Marshal Sir Frank Holroyd 
1993–94 Dr G.G Pope
1994–95 Sir C.B.G Masefield
1995–96 Sir Donald Spiers
1996–97 Professor John Green
1997–98 Stewart M John
1998–99 Captain W.D Lowe
1999–00 Lanthony Edwards
2000–01 Trevor Trueman
2001–02 Professor Ian Poll
2002–03 Lee Balthazor
2003–04 Air Marshal Sir Peter Norriss
2004–05 Roland Fairfield
2005–06 Air Marshal Sir Colin Terry
2006–07 Gordon F. Page
2007–08 David Marshall 
2008–09 Captain David Rowland
2009–10 Dr. Mike Steeden
2010–11 Air Vice-Marshal David Couzens
2011–12 Lee Balthazor
2012–13 Phil Boyle
2013–14 Jenny Body
2014–15 Air Commodore Bill Tyack
2015–16 Martin Broadhurst
2016 Honorary President Prince Charles, Prince of Wales 
2016–17 Professor Chris Atkin
2017–18 Sir Stephen Dalton FRAeS 
2018–19 Rear Adm Simon Henley CEng FRAeS 
2019–21 Professor Jonathan Cooper 
2021–22 Howard Nye MInstP FRAeS
2022–23 Air Cdre Peter Round FRAeS

Chief Executives
 Keith Mans was chief executive from 1998-2009
 Simon Luxmoore was chief executive from 2009-2018
 Sir Brian Burridge CBE FRAeS, from 1 October 2018
 David Edwards FRAeS, from 1 October 2021

Medals and awards

In addition to the award of Fellowship of the Royal Aeronautical Society (FRAeS), the Society awards several other medals and prizes. These include its Gold, Silver, and Bronze medals. The very first gold medal was awarded in 1909 to the Wright Brothers. Although it is unusual for more than one medal (in each of the three grades) to be awarded annually, since 2004 the Society has also periodically awarded team medals (Gold, Silver, and Bronze) for exceptional or groundbreaking teamwork in aeronautical research and development. Others awarded have included the R. P. Alston Memorial Prize for developments in flight-testing, the Edward Busk prize for applied aerodynamics, the Wakefield Medal for advances in aviation safety, and an Orville Wright Prize. Honorary Fellowships and Honorary Companionships are awarded as well.

The Sir Robert Hardingham Sword The Sir Robert Hardingham Sword is awarded in recognition of outstanding service to the RAeS by a member of the Society. Nominally an annual award, in practice the award is only made about one year in two.

Notable Medal recipients

Notable Gold Medal recipients include:
 1909 - Wilbur and Orville Wright
 1910 - Octave Chanute
 1945 - Air Cdre Frank Whittle
 1950 - Sir Geoffrey de Havilland
 1955 - Ernest Hives, 1st Baron Hives
 1958 - Sydney Camm
 1959 - Marcel Dassault
 1960 - Sir Frederick Handley Page
 1977 - George Lee
 1983 - Geoffrey Lilley
1993 - Reimar Horten
 2012 - Elon Musk

Honorary Fellows

 1950 Sir Thomas Sopwith
 1953 The Duke of Edinburgh
 1954 Air Commodore Sir Frank Whittle
 1957 The Prince of The Netherlands
 1959 Professor J. Ackeret
 1960 Sir George Edwards
 1962 N. E. Rowe
 1963 Sir Alfred Pugsley
 1964 Sir Denning Pearson
 1965 Sir Arnold Hall
 1969 Dr R. R. Gilruth
 1969 Lord Kings Norton
 1969 Sir Archibald Russell
 1970 Sir Robert Cockburn
 1971 Professor Sydney Goldstein
 1974 S. D. Davies
 1975 C. Abell
 1975 H. A. L. Ziegler
 1976 Sir Keith Granville
 1977 Sir William Hawthorne
 1978 The Prince of Wales
 1978 Dr O. Nagano
 1978 Dr W. Tye
 1979 Professor D. Keith-Lucas
 1980 E. H. Heinemann
 1980 Sir Frederick Page
 1980 Sir Peter Masefield
 1981 Sir Robert Hunt
 1982 H. Davies
 1983 Dr G. S. Hislop
 1983 Professor Dipl-Ing G. Madelung
 1983 R. H. Beteille
 1984 J. T. Stamper 
 1984 Professor A. D. Young
 1984 Sir Philip Foreman
 1985 J. F. Sutter
 1985 King Hussein of Jordan
 1985 Sir Roy Sisson
 1986 Professor J. H. Argyris
 1986 Dr K. G. Wilkinson
 1987 F. Cereti
 1988 Professor H. Ashley
 1988 G. P. Dollimore
 1989 Admiral Sir Raymond Lygo
 1989 Air Marshal Sir Charles Pringle
 1989 F. d' Allest
 1990 P. A. Hearne
 1990 Sir James Lighthill
 1991 Sir Ralph Robins
 1992 Professor Em Dr-Ing K. H. Doetsch
 1992 Sir John Charnley
 1992 G. H. Lee
 1993 The Duke of Kent
 1993 Professor Dr.-Ing. B. J. Habibie
 1993 R. W. Howard
 1994 Baroness Platt of Writtle
 1994 Lord Tombs of Brailes
 1994 S. Gillibrand
 1995 C. H. Kaman
 1995 Professor J. L. Stollery
 1995 R. W. R. McNulty
 1996 P. M. Condit
 1996 Sir Richard H. Evans
 1997 J. Pierson
 1997 N. Augustine
 1997 J. Cunningham
 1998 M. Flanagan
 1998 R. Belyakov
 1998 R. Yates
 1998 S. Ajaz Ali
 1999 A. Caporaletti
 1999 D. Burrell
 2000 N. Barber
 2000 Professor Ing E. Vallerani
 2000 R. Collette
 2000 Sir Donald Spiers
 2001 A. Welch OBE
 2001 Dr B. Halse
 2001 J. Bechat
 2001 Sir Arthur Marshall OBE
 2002 A Mulally
 2003 P Ruffles
 2003 Prof. Sir John Horlock
 2003 J. Thomas
 2004 Captain Eric Brown
 2005 Sir Michael Cobham
 2006 General Charles E. Yeager
 2006 Air Vice-Marshal Professor R.A. Mason
 2008 Professor Beric Skews
 2009 William Kenneth Maciver CBE
 2009 Gordon Page CBE
 2012 Ing S Pancotti
 2012 Professor M Gaster
 2013 Professor K Ridgway CBE
 2013 Professor R J Stalker
 2014 C P Smith CBE
 2014 Professor B Cheng
 2014 J-P Herteman
 2015 Professor Sir Martin Sweeting OBE
 2015 J-J Dordain
 2015 Professor R K Agarwal
 2016 P Fabre
 2016 Sir Michael Marshall CBE
 2016 Major T N Peake CMG
 2016 Dr D W Richardson
 2016 M J Ryan CBE
 2017 Professor R Bor
 2018 Major General Desmond Barker
 2018 M Bryson CBE
 2018 F R Donaldson
 2018 Colonel J W Kittinger Jr
 2019 Dr G. Satheesh Reddy

Honorary Companions 

 1961 Sir John Toothill
 1963 Lord Wilberforce
 1965 L. A. Wingfield
 1966 J. Davison
 1973 Lord Elworthy
 1975 H. Kremer
 1975 Sir R. Verdon-Smith
 1978 J. R. Stainton
 1979 Lord Keith of Castleacre
 1980 Sir Arthur Marshall
 1982 Sir Douglas Lowe
 1983 L. C. Hunting
 1985 Lord King of Wartnaby
 1985 F. A. A. Wootton
 1986 G. Pattie
 1987 Sir Norman Payne
 1988 Sir Colin Marshall
 1989 Air Chief Marshal Sir Peter Harding
 1989 M. D. Bishop
 1990 T. Mayer
 1991 R. F. Baxter
 1991 Sir Adrian Swire
 1992 Dr T. A. Ryan
 1993 Sir Richard Branson
 1994 Professor C. J. Pennycuick
 1995 Air Marshal M. Nur Khan
 1996 Sir Neil Cossons
 1997 A. J. Goldman
 1997 R. D. Lapthorne
 1998 P. Martin
 1999 Sheikh Hamdan bin Mubarak Al Nahyan
 2000 Sheikh Ahmed Bin Saeed Al Maktoum
 2002 J Travolta
 2002 R Turnill
 2003 Dr C C Kong
 2010 Giovanni Bisignani
 2015 David Bent

Named Lectures

Henson & Stringfellow Lecture and Dinner 

The annual Henson & Stringfellow Lecture and Dinner is hosted yearly by the Yeovil Branch of the Royal Aeronautical Society, held at Westland Leisure Complex, and is a key social and networking event of the Yeovil lecture season. It is a black tie event attracting over 200 guests drawn from all sectors of the aerospace community.

John Stringfellow created, alongside William Samuel Henson, the first powered flight aircraft, developed in Chard, Somerset, which flew unmanned in 1848, 63 years prior to brothers Wilbur & Orville Wrights' flight.

Wilbur & Orville Wright Named Lecture
The Wilbur & Orville Wright Named Lecture was established in 1911 to honour the Wright brothers, the successful and experienced mechanical engineers who completed the first successful controlled powered flight on 17 December 1903. The Wilbur & Orville Wright Lecture is the principal event in the Society’s year, given by distinguished members of the US and UK aerospace communities.

The 99th Lecture was given by Piers Sellers, astronaut, on 9 December 2010 at the Society's Headquarters in London.

The 100th Lecture was given by Suzanna Darcy-Henneman, Chief Pilot & Director of Training, Boeing Commercial Airplanes, on 8 December 2011.

The 101st Lecture was given by Tony Parasida, corporate vice president, The Boeing Company, on 20 December 2012.

The 102nd Lecture was given by Thomas Enders, CEO of EADS, on 12 December 2013.

The 103rd Lecture was given by Patrick M Dewar, executive vice president, Lockheed Martin International in December 2014.

The 104th Lecture was given by Nigel Whitehead, Group Managing Director – Programmes and Support, BAE Systems plc in December 2015.

The 105th Lecture was given by ACM Sir Stephen Hillier, Chief of the Air Staff, Royal Air Force on 6 December 2016.

The 106th Lecture was given by Martin Rolfe, chief executive officer, NATS on 5 December 2017.

The 107th Lecture was given by Leanne Caret, Vice President, The Boeing Company and President & CEO, Boeing Defense, Space & Security on 4 December 2018.

The 108th Lecture was given by David Mackay FRAeS, Chief Pilot, Virgin Galactic on 10 December 2019.

Amy Johnson Named Lecture
The Amy Johnson Named Lecture was inaugurated in 2011 by the Royal Aeronautical Society's Women in Aviation and Aerospace Committee to celebrate a century of women in flight and to honour Britain's most famous woman aviator. The Lecture is held on or close to 6 July every year to mark the date in 1929 when Amy Johnson was awarded her pilot’s licence. The Lecture is intended to tackle serious issues of interest to a wide audience, not just women. High-profile women from industry are asked to lecture on a topic that speaks of future challenges of interest to everyone.

Carolyn McCall, chief executive of EasyJet, delivered the Inaugural Lecture on 6 July 2011 at the Society's Headquarters in London.

The second Amy Johnson Named Lecture was delivered by Marion C. Blakey, president and chief executive of Aerospace Industries Association (AIA), on 5 July 2012.

The third Lecture was delivered by Gretchen Haskins, former Group Director of the Safety Regulation Group of the UK Civil Aviation Authority (CAA), on 8 July 2013.

In 2017, Katherine Bennett OBE FRAeS, Senior Vice President Public Affairs, Airbus gave the Amy Johnson Lecture and in 2018 Air Vice-Marshal Sue Gray, CB, OBE from the Royal Air Force gave the Amy Johnson Lecture in honour of the 100th anniversary of the RAF.

Sopwith Named Lecture
The Sopwith Lecture was established in 1990 to honour Sir Thomas Sopwith CBE, Hon FRAeS. In the years prior to World War I, Sopwith became England’s premier aviator and established the first authoritative test pilot school in the world. He also founded England’s first major flight school. Between 1912 and 1920 Sopwith’s Company produced over 16,000 aircraft of 60 types.

In 2017 the lecture was delivered by Tony Wood, chief operating officer of Meggitt PLC.

In 2018 the lecture was delivered by Group Captain Ian Townsend ADC MA RAF, Station Commander, RAF Marham.

In 2019 the lecture was delivered by Billie Flynn, F-35 Lightning II Test Pilot, Lockheed Martin.

In 2020 the lecture was delivered online by Dirk Hoke, CEO, Airbus Defence & Space.

In Popular Culture

The July 18th.,1975 edition of the society's Journal included the first use of the misattributed term, "Beam Me Up, Scotty", in a sentence, viz:"...in a sort of, 'Beam me up, Scotty', routine".

References

External links

 Official RAeS site
 List of awards of Medals
 RAeS Flight Simulation Group site
 New Zealand Division site
 Australian Division site
 Montreal Branch site
 Chard Museum The Birth of Powered Flight.
 Aero Society Podcast The Official RAeS online media channel

Video clips
 Aero Society YouTube channel
 RAeS Careers

 
1866 establishments in the United Kingdom
Aerospace engineering organizations
Aeronautics organizations
Aviation organisations based in the United Kingdom
 
ECUK Licensed Members
Learned societies of the United Kingdom
Organisations based in London with royal patronage
Organisations based in the City of Westminster
Organizations established in 1866
Aeronautical
Science and technology in the United Kingdom